Colorado (other variants) is a state in the Mountain West subregion of the Western United States. It encompasses most of the Southern Rocky Mountains, as well as the northeastern portion of the Colorado Plateau and the western edge of the Great Plains. Colorado is the eighth most extensive and 21st most populous U.S. state. The 2020 United States census enumerated the population of Colorado at 5,773,714, an increase of 14.80% since the 2010 census.

The region has been inhabited by Native Americans and their ancestors for at least 13,500 years and possibly much longer. The eastern edge of the Rocky Mountains was a major migration route for early peoples who spread throughout the Americas. "" is the Spanish adjective meaning "red", the color of the Fountain Formation outcroppings found up and down the Front Range of the Rocky Mountains. The Territory of Colorado was organized on February 28, 1861, and on August 1, 1876, U.S. President Ulysses S. Grant signed Proclamation 230 admitting Colorado to the Union as the 38th state. Colorado is nicknamed the "Centennial State" because it became a state one century (and four weeks) after the signing of the United States Declaration of Independence.

Colorado is bordered by Wyoming to the north, Nebraska to the northeast, Kansas to the east, Oklahoma to the southeast, New Mexico to the south, and Utah to the west, and touches Arizona to the southwest at the Four Corners. Colorado is noted for its vivid landscape of mountains, forests, high plains, mesas, canyons, plateaus, rivers, and desert lands. Colorado is one of the Mountain states, and is a part of the western, and is often considered to be part of the southwestern, United States.

Denver is the capital and most populous city. Residents of the state are known as Coloradans, although the antiquated "Coloradoan" is occasionally used. Major parts of the economy include government and defense, mining, agriculture, tourism, and increasingly other kinds of manufacturing. With increasing temperatures and decreasing water availability, Colorado's agriculture, forestry, and tourism economies are expected to be heavily affected by climate change.

The state is one of the most educated, developed, and wealthiest, ranking 3rd in percentage of population 25 and over with a bachelor's degree and 8th in percentage of population 25 and over with an advanced degree, 9th on the American Human Development Index, and 8th in per capita income and 9th in median household income.

History

The region that is today the State of Colorado has been inhabited by Native Americans and their Paleoamerican ancestors for at least 13,500 years and possibly more than 37,000 years. The eastern edge of the Rocky Mountains was a major migration route that was important to the spread of early peoples throughout the Americas. The Lindenmeier site in Larimer County contains artifacts dating from approximately 8720 BCE. The Ancient Pueblo peoples lived in the valleys and mesas of the Colorado Plateau. The Ute Nation inhabited the mountain valleys of the Southern Rocky Mountains and the Western Rocky Mountains, even as far east as the Front Range of the present day. The Apache and the Comanche also inhabited the Eastern and Southeastern parts of the state. In the 17th century, the Arapaho and Cheyenne moved west from the Great Lakes region to hunt across the High Plains of Colorado and Wyoming.

The Spanish Empire claimed Colorado as part of its New Mexico province before U.S. involvement in the region. The U.S. acquired a territorial claim to the eastern Rocky Mountains with the Louisiana Purchase from France in 1803. This U.S. claim conflicted with the claim by Spain to the upper Arkansas River Basin as the exclusive trading zone of its colony of Santa Fe de Nuevo México. In 1806, Zebulon Pike led a U.S. Army reconnaissance expedition into the disputed region. Colonel Pike and his troops were arrested by Spanish cavalrymen in the San Luis Valley the following February, taken to Chihuahua, and expelled from Mexico the following July.

The U.S. relinquished its claim to all land south and west of the Arkansas River and south of 42nd parallel north and west of the 100th meridian west as part of its purchase of Florida from Spain with the Adams-Onís Treaty of 1819. The treaty took effect on February 22, 1821. Having settled its border with Spain, the U.S. admitted the southeastern portion of the Territory of Missouri to the Union as the state of Missouri on August 10, 1821. The remainder of Missouri Territory, including what would become northeastern Colorado, became an unorganized territory and remained so for 33 years over the question of slavery. After 11 years of war, Spain finally recognized the independence of Mexico with the Treaty of Córdoba signed on August 24, 1821. Mexico eventually ratified the Adams–Onís Treaty in 1831. The Texian Revolt of 1835–36 fomented a dispute between the U.S. and Mexico which eventually erupted into the Mexican–American War in 1846. Mexico surrendered its northern territory to the U.S. with the Treaty of Guadalupe Hidalgo after the war in 1848; this included much of the western and southern areas of the current state of Colorado.

Most American settlers traveling overland west to the Oregon Country, the new goldfields of California, or the new Mormon settlements of the State of Deseret in the Salt Lake Valley, avoided the rugged Southern Rocky Mountains, and instead followed the North Platte River and Sweetwater River to South Pass (Wyoming), the lowest crossing of the Continental Divide between the Southern Rocky Mountains and the Central Rocky Mountains. In 1849, the Mormons of the Salt Lake Valley organized the extralegal State of Deseret, claiming the entire Great Basin and all lands drained by the rivers Green, Grand, and Colorado. The federal government of the U.S. flatly refused to recognize the new Mormon government, because it was theocratic and sanctioned plural marriage. Instead, the Compromise of 1850 divided the Mexican Cession and the northwestern claims of Texas into a new state and two new territories, the state of California, the Territory of New Mexico, and the Territory of Utah. On April 9, 1851, Mexican American settlers from the area of Taos settled the village of San Luis, then in the New Mexico Territory, later to become Colorado's first permanent Euro-American settlement.

In 1854, Senator Stephen A. Douglas persuaded the U.S. Congress to divide the unorganized territory east of the Continental Divide into two new organized territories, the Territory of Kansas and the Territory of Nebraska, and an unorganized southern region known as the Indian territory. Each new territory was to decide the fate of slavery within its boundaries, but this compromise merely served to fuel animosity between free soil and pro-slavery factions.

The gold seekers organized the Provisional Government of the Territory of Jefferson on August 24, 1859, but this new territory failed to secure approval from the Congress of the United States embroiled in the debate over slavery. The election of Abraham Lincoln for the President of the United States on November 6, 1860, led to the secession of nine southern slave states and the threat of civil war among the states. Seeking to augment the political power of the Union states, the Republican Party-dominated Congress quickly admitted the eastern portion of the Territory of Kansas into the Union as the free State of Kansas on January 29, 1861, leaving the western portion of the Kansas Territory, and its gold-mining areas, as unorganized territory.

Territory act

Thirty days later on February 28, 1861, outgoing U.S. President James Buchanan signed an Act of Congress organizing the free Territory of Colorado. The original boundaries of Colorado remain unchanged except for government survey amendments. The name Colorado was chosen because it was commonly believed that the Colorado River originated in the territory. In 1776, Spanish priest Silvestre Vélez de Escalante recorded that Native Americans in the area knew the river as el Rio Colorado for the red-brown silt that the river carried from the mountains. In 1859, a U.S. Army topographic expedition led by Captain John Macomb located the confluence of the Green River with the Grand River in what is now Canyonlands National Park in Utah. The Macomb party designated the confluence as the source of the Colorado River.

On April 12, 1861, South Carolina artillery opened fire on Fort Sumter to start the American Civil War. While many gold seekers held sympathies for the Confederacy, the vast majority remained fiercely loyal to the Union cause.

In 1862, a force of Texas cavalry invaded the Territory of New Mexico and captured Santa Fe on March 10. The object of this Western Campaign was to seize or disrupt the gold fields of Colorado and California and to seize ports on the Pacific Ocean for the Confederacy. A hastily organized force of Colorado volunteers force-marched from Denver City, Colorado Territory, to Glorieta Pass, New Mexico Territory, in an attempt to block the Texans. On March 28, the Coloradans and local New Mexico volunteers stopped the Texans at the Battle of Glorieta Pass, destroyed their cannon and supply wagons, and dispersed 500 of their horses and mules. The Texans were forced to retreat to Santa Fe. Having lost the supplies for their campaign and finding little support in New Mexico, the Texans abandoned Santa Fe and returned to San Antonio in defeat. The Confederacy made no further attempts to seize the Southwestern United States.

In 1864, Territorial Governor John Evans appointed the Reverend John Chivington as Colonel of the Colorado Volunteers with orders to protect white settlers from Cheyenne and Arapaho warriors who were accused of stealing cattle. Colonel Chivington ordered his troops to attack a band of Cheyenne and Arapaho encamped along Sand Creek. Chivington reported that his troops killed more than 500 warriors. The militia returned to Denver City in triumph, but several officers reported that the so-called battle was a blatant massacre of Indians at peace, that most of the dead were women and children, and that the bodies of the dead had been hideously mutilated and desecrated. Three U.S. Army inquiries condemned the action, and incoming President Andrew Johnson asked Governor Evans for his resignation, but none of the perpetrators was ever punished. This event is now known as the Sand Creek massacre.

In the midst and aftermath of the Civil War, many discouraged prospectors returned to their homes, but a few stayed and developed mines, mills, farms, ranches, roads, and towns in Colorado Territory. On September 14, 1864, James Huff discovered silver near Argentine Pass, the first of many silver strikes. In 1867, the Union Pacific Railroad laid its tracks west to Weir, now Julesburg, in the northeast corner of the Territory. The Union Pacific linked up with the Central Pacific Railroad at Promontory Summit, Utah, on May 10, 1869, to form the First transcontinental railroad. The Denver Pacific Railway reached Denver in June of the following year, and the Kansas Pacific arrived two months later to forge the second line across the continent. In 1872, rich veins of silver were discovered in the San Juan Mountains on the Ute Indian reservation in southwestern Colorado. The Ute people were removed from the San Juans the following year.

Statehood

The United States Congress passed an enabling act on March 3, 1875, specifying the requirements for the Territory of Colorado to become a state. On August 1, 1876 (four weeks after the Centennial of the United States), U.S. President Ulysses S. Grant signed a proclamation admitting Colorado to the Union as the 38th state and earning it the moniker "Centennial State".

The discovery of a major silver lode near Leadville in 1878 triggered the Colorado Silver Boom. The Sherman Silver Purchase Act of 1890 invigorated silver mining, and Colorado's last, but greatest, gold strike at Cripple Creek a few months later lured a new generation of gold seekers. Colorado women were granted the right to vote on November 7, 1893, making Colorado the second state to grant universal suffrage and the first one by a popular vote (of Colorado men). The repeal of the Sherman Silver Purchase Act in 1893 led to a staggering collapse of the mining and agricultural economy of Colorado, but the state slowly and steadily recovered. Between the 1880s and 1930s, Denver's floriculture industry developed into a major industry in Colorado. This period became known locally as the Carnation Gold Rush.

Twentieth and twenty-first centuries

Poor labor conditions and discontent among miners resulted in several major clashes between strikers and the Colorado National Guard, including the 1903–1904 Western Federation of Miners Strike and Colorado Coalfield War, the latter of which included the Ludlow massacre that killed a dozen women and children. Both the 1913–1914 Coalfield War and the Denver streetcar strike of 1920 resulted in federal troops intervening to end the violence. In 1927, the Columbine Mine massacre resulted in six dead strikers following a confrontation with Colorado Rangers. More than 5,000 Colorado miners—many immigrants—are estimated to have died in accidents since records were first formally collected following an 1884 accident in Crested Butte that killed 59.

In 1924, the Ku Klux Klan Colorado Realm achieved dominance in Colorado politics. With peak membership levels, the Second Klan levied significant control over both the local and state Democrat and Republican parties, particularly in the governor's office and city governments of Denver, Cañon City, and Durango. A particularly strong element of the Klan controlled the Denver Police. Cross burnings became semi-regular occurrences in cities such as Florence and Pueblo. The Klan targeted African-Americans, Catholics, Eastern European immigrants, and other non-White Protestant groups. Efforts by non-Klan lawmen and lawyers including Philip Van Cise lead to a rapid decline in the organization's power, with membership waning significantly by the end of the 1920s.

Colorado became the first western state to host a major political convention when the Democratic Party met in Denver in 1908. By the U.S. census in 1930, the population of Colorado first exceeded one million residents. Colorado suffered greatly through the Great Depression and the Dust Bowl of the 1930s, but a major wave of immigration following World War II boosted Colorado's fortune. Tourism became a mainstay of the state economy, and high technology became an important economic engine. The United States Census Bureau estimated that the population of Colorado exceeded five million in 2009.

On September 11, 1957, a plutonium fire occurred at the Rocky Flats Plant, which resulted in the significant plutonium contamination of surrounding populated areas.

From the 1940s and 1970s, many protest movements gained momentum in Colorado, predominantly in Denver. This included the Chicano Movement, a civil rights, and social movement of Mexican Americans emphasizing a Chicano identity that is widely considered to have begun in Denver. The National Chicano Liberation Youth Conference was held in Colorado in March 1969.

In 1967, Colorado was the first state to loosen restrictions on abortion when governor John Love signed a law allowing abortions in cases of rape, incest, or threats to the woman's mental or physical health. Many states followed Colorado's lead in loosening abortion laws in the 1960s and 1970s.

Since the late 1990s, Colorado has been the site of multiple major mass shootings, including the infamous Columbine High School massacre in 1999 which made international news, where Eric Harris and Dylan Klebold killed 12 students and one teacher, before committing suicide. The incident has since spawned many copycat incidents. On July 20, 2012, a gunman killed 12 people in a movie theater in Aurora. The state responded with tighter restrictions on firearms, including introducing a limit on magazine capacity. On March 22, 2021, a gunman killed 10 people, including a police officer, in a King Soopers supermarket in Boulder. In an instance of anti-LGBT violence, a gunman killed 5 people at a nightclub in Colorado Springs during the night of November 19–20, 2022.

Four warships of the U.S. Navy have been named the USS Col orado. The first USS Colorado was named for the Colorado River and served in the Civil War and later the Asiatic Squadron, where it was attacked during the 1871 Korean Expedition. The later three ships were named in honor of the state, including an armored cruiser and the battleship USS Colorado, the latter of which was the lead ship of her class and served in World War II in the Pacific beginning in 1941. At the time of the attack on Pearl Harbor, the battleship USS Colorado was located at the naval base in San Diego, California, and thus went unscathed. The most recent vessel to bear the name USS Colorado is Virginia-class submarine USS Colorado (SSN-788), which was commissioned in 2018.

Geography

Colorado is notable for its diverse geography, which includes alpine mountains, high plains, deserts with huge sand dunes, and deep canyons. In 1861, the United States Congress defined the boundaries of the new Territory of Colorado exclusively by lines of latitude and longitude, stretching from 37°N to 41°N latitude, and from 102°02′48″W to 109°02′48″W longitude (25°W to 32°W from the Washington Meridian). After  years of government surveys, the borders of Colorado were officially defined by 697 boundary markers and 697 straight boundary lines. Colorado, Wyoming, and Utah are the only states that have their borders defined solely by straight boundary lines with no natural features. The southwest corner of Colorado is the Four Corners Monument at 36°59′56″N, 109°2′43″W. The Four Corners Monument, located at the place where Colorado, New Mexico, Arizona, and Utah meet, is the only place in the United States where four states meet.

Plains

Approximately half of Colorado is flat and rolling land. The Colorado plains are mostly prairies but also include deciduous forests, buttes, and canyons. Precipitation averages  annually.

Eastern Colorado is presently mainly farmland and rangeland, along with small farming villages and towns. Corn, wheat, hay, soybeans, and oats are all typical crops. Most villages and towns in this region boast both a water tower and a grain elevator. Irrigation water is available from both surface and subterranean sources. Surface water sources include the South Platte, the Arkansas River, and a few other streams. Subterranean water is generally accessed through artesian wells. Heavy usage of these wells for irrigation purposes caused underground water reserves to decline in the region. Eastern Colorado also hosts a considerable amount and range of livestock, such as cattle ranches and hog farms.

Front Range

Roughly 70% of Colorado's population resides along the eastern edge of the Rocky Mountains in the Front Range Urban Corridor between Cheyenne, Wyoming, and Pueblo, Colorado. This region is partially protected from prevailing storms that blow in from the Pacific Ocean region by the high Rockies in the middle of Colorado. The "Front Range" includes Denver, Boulder, Fort Collins, Loveland, Castle Rock, Colorado Springs, Pueblo, Greeley, and other townships and municipalities in between. On the other side of the Rockies, the significant population centers in western Colorado (which is known as "The Western Slope") are the cities of Grand Junction, Durango, and Montrose.

Mountains

To the west of the Great Plains of Colorado rises the eastern slope of the Rocky Mountains. Notable peaks of the Rocky Mountains include Longs Peak, Mount Evans, Pikes Peak, and the Spanish Peaks near Walsenburg, in southern Colorado. This area drains to the east and the southeast, ultimately either via the Mississippi River or the Rio Grande into the Gulf of Mexico.

Above this tree line, only alpine vegetation grows. Only small parts of the Colorado Rockies are snow-covered year-round.

Much of the alpine snow melts by mid-August except for a few snow-capped peaks and a few small glaciers. The Colorado Mineral Belt, stretching from the San Juan Mountains in the southwest to Boulder and Central City on the front range, contains most of the historic gold- and silver-mining districts of Colorado. Mount Elbert is the highest summit of the Rocky Mountains. The 30 highest major summits of the Rocky Mountains of North America are all within the state.

The summit of Mount Elbert at  elevation in Lake County is the highest point in Colorado and the Rocky Mountains of North America. Colorado is the only U.S. state that lies entirely above 1,000 meters elevation. The point where the Arikaree River flows out of Yuma County, Colorado, and into Cheyenne County, Kansas, is the lowest in Colorado at  elevation. This point, which is the highest low elevation point of any state, is higher than the high elevation points of 18 states and the District of Columbia.

Continental Divide

The Continental Divide of the Americas extends along the crest of the Rocky Mountains. The area of Colorado to the west of the Continental Divide is called the Western Slope of Colorado. West of the Continental Divide, water flows to the southwest via the Colorado River and the Green River into the Gulf of California.

Within the interior of the Rocky Mountains are several large parks which are high broad basins. In the north, on the east side of the Continental Divide is the North Park of Colorado. The North Park is drained by the North Platte River, which flows north into Wyoming and Nebraska. Just to the south of North Park, but on the western side of the Continental Divide, is the Middle Park of Colorado, which is drained by the Colorado River. The South Park of Colorado is the region of the headwaters of the South Platte River.

South Central region

In south-central Colorado is the large San Luis Valley, where the headwaters of the Rio Grande are located. The northern part of the valley is the San Luis Closed Basin, an endorheic basin that helped created the Great Sand Dunes. The valley sits between the Sangre De Cristo Mountains and San Juan Mountains. The Rio Grande drains due south into New Mexico, Texas, and Mexico. Across the Sangre de Cristo Range to the east of the San Luis Valley lies the Wet Mountain Valley. These basins, particularly the San Luis Valley, lie along the Rio Grande Rift, a major geological formation of the Rocky Mountains, and its branches.

Western Slope

The Western Slope of Colorado includes the western face of the Rocky Mountains and all of the area to the western border. This area includes several terrains and climates from alpine mountains to arid deserts. The Western Slope includes many ski resort towns in the Rocky Mountains and towns west to Utah. It is less populous than the Front Range but includes a large number of national parks and monuments.

The northwestern corner of Colorado is a sparsely populated region, and it contains part of the noted Dinosaur National Monument, which not only is a paleontological area, but is also a scenic area of rocky hills, canyons, arid desert, and streambeds. Here, the Green River briefly crosses over into Colorado.

The Western Slope of Colorado is drained by the Colorado River and its tributaries (primarily the Gunnison River, Green River, and the San Juan River). The Colorado River flows through Glenwood Canyon, and then through an arid valley made up of desert from Rifle to Parachute, through the desert canyon of De Beque Canyon, and into the arid desert of Grand Valley, where the city of Grand Junction is located.

Also prominent is the Grand Mesa, which lies to the southeast of Grand Junction; the high San Juan Mountains, a rugged mountain range; and to the north and west of the San Juan Mountains, the Colorado Plateau.

Grand Junction, Colorado, at the confluence of the Colorado and Gunnison Rivers, is the largest city on the Western Slope. Grand Junction and Durango are the only major centers of television broadcasting west of the Continental Divide in Colorado, though most mountain resort communities publish daily newspapers. Grand Junction is located at the juncture of Interstate 70 and US 50, the only major highways in western Colorado. Grand Junction is also along the major railroad of the Western Slope, the Union Pacific. This railroad also provides the tracks for Amtrak's California Zephyr passenger train, which crosses the Rocky Mountains between Denver and Grand Junction.

The Western Slope includes multiple notable destinations in the Colorado Rocky Mountains, including Glenwood Springs, with its resort hot springs, and the ski resorts of Aspen, Breckenridge, Vail, Crested Butte, Steamboat Springs, and Telluride.

Higher education in and near the Western Slope can be found at Colorado Mesa University in Grand Junction, Western Colorado University in Gunnison, Fort Lewis College in Durango, and Colorado Mountain College in Glenwood Springs and Steamboat Springs.

The Four Corners Monument in the southwest corner of Colorado marks the common boundary of Colorado, New Mexico, Arizona, and Utah; the only such place in the United States.

Climate

The climate of Colorado is more complex than states outside of the Mountain States region. Unlike most other states, southern Colorado is not always warmer than northern Colorado. Most of Colorado is made up of mountains, foothills, high plains, and desert lands. Mountains and surrounding valleys greatly affect the local climate.  Northeast, east, and southeast Colorado are mostly the high plains, while Northern Colorado is a mix of high plains, foothills, and mountains. Northwest and west Colorado are predominantly mountainous, with some desert lands mixed in. Southwest and southern Colorado are a complex mixture of desert and mountain areas.

Eastern Plains

The climate of the Eastern Plains is semi-arid (Köppen climate classification: BSk) with low humidity and moderate precipitation, usually from  annually, although many areas near the rivers are semi-humid climate. The area is known for its abundant sunshine and cool, clear nights, which give this area a great average diurnal temperature range. The difference between the highs of the days and the lows of the nights can be considerable as warmth dissipates to space during clear nights, the heat radiation not being trapped by clouds. The Front Range urban corridor, where most of the population of Colorado resides, lies in a pronounced precipitation shadow as a result of being on the lee side of the Rocky Mountains.

In summer, this area can have many days above 95 °F (35 °C) and often 100 °F (38 °C). On the plains, the winter lows usually range from 25 to −10 °F (−4 to −23 °C). About 75% of the precipitation falls within the growing season, from April to September, but this area is very prone to droughts. Most of the precipitation comes from thunderstorms, which can be severe, and from major snowstorms that occur in the winter and early spring. Otherwise, winters tend to be mostly dry and cold.

In much of the region, March is the snowiest month. April and May are normally the rainiest months, while April is the wettest month overall. The Front Range cities closer to the mountains tend to be warmer in the winter due to Chinook winds which warms the area, sometimes bringing temperatures of 70 °F (21 °C) or higher in the winter. The average July temperature is 55 °F (13 °C) in the morning and 90 °F (32 °C) in the afternoon. The average January temperature is 18 °F (−8 °C) in the morning and 48 °F (9 °C) in the afternoon, although variation between consecutive days can be 40 °F (20 °C).

Front Range foothills

Just west of the plains and into the foothills, there is a wide variety of climate types. Locations merely a few miles apart can experience entirely different weather depending on the topography. Most valleys have a semi-arid climate, not unlike the eastern plains, which transitions to an alpine climate at the highest elevations. Microclimates also exist in local areas that run nearly the entire spectrum of climates, including subtropical highland (Cfb/Cwb), humid subtropical (Cfa), humid continental (Dfa/Dfb), Mediterranean (Csa/Csb) and subarctic (Dfc).

Extreme weather

Extreme weather changes are common in Colorado, although a significant portion of the extreme weather occurs in the least populated areas of the state. Thunderstorms are common east of the Continental Divide in the spring and summer, yet are usually brief. Hail is a common sight in the mountains east of the Divide and across the eastern Plains, especially the northeast part of the state. Hail is the most commonly reported warm-season severe weather hazard, and occasionally causes human injuries, as well as significant property damage. The eastern Plains are subject to some of the biggest hail storms in North America. Notable examples are the severe hailstorms that hit Denver on July 11, 1990, and May 8, 2017, the latter being the costliest ever in the state.

The Eastern Plains are part of the extreme western portion of Tornado Alley; some damaging tornadoes in the Eastern Plains include the 1990 Limon F3 tornado and the 2008 Windsor EF3 tornado, which devastated a small town. Portions of the eastern Plains see especially frequent tornadoes, both those spawned from mesocyclones in supercell thunderstorms and from less intense landspouts, such as within the Denver convergence vorticity zone (DCVZ).

The Plains are also susceptible to occasional floods and particularly severe flash floods, which are caused both by thunderstorms and by the rapid melting of snow in the mountains during warm weather. Notable examples include the 1965 Denver Flood, the Big Thompson River flooding of 1976 and the 2013 Colorado floods. Hot weather is common during summers in Denver. The city's record in 1901 for the number of consecutive days above 90 °F (32 °C) was broken during the summer of 2008. The new record of 24 consecutive days surpassed the previous record by almost a week.

Much of Colorado is very dry, with the state averaging only  of precipitation per year statewide. The state rarely experiences a time when some portion is not in some degree of drought. The lack of precipitation contributes to the severity of wildfires in the state, such as the Hayman Fire of 2002. Other notable fires include the Fourmile Canyon Fire of 2010, the Waldo Canyon Fire and High Park Fire of June 2012, and the Black Forest Fire of June 2013. Even these fires were exceeded in severity by the Pine Gulch Fire, Cameron Peak Fire, and East Troublesome Fire in 2020, all being the three largest fires in Colorado history (see 2020 Colorado wildfires). And the Marshall Fire which started on December 30, 2021, while not the largest in state history, was the most destructive ever in terms of property loss (see Marshall Fire).

However, some of the mountainous regions of Colorado receive a huge amount of moisture from winter snowfalls. The spring melts of these snows often cause great waterflows in the Yampa River, the Colorado River, the Rio Grande, the Arkansas River, the North Platte River, and the South Platte River.

Water flowing out of the Colorado Rocky Mountains is a very significant source of water for the farms, towns, and cities of the southwest states of New Mexico, Arizona, Utah, and Nevada, as well as the Midwest, such as Nebraska and Kansas, and the southern states of Oklahoma and Texas. A significant amount of water is also diverted for use in California; occasionally (formerly naturally and consistently), the flow of water reaches northern Mexico.

Climate change

Records

Extreme temperatures

Earthquakes

Despite its mountainous terrain, Colorado is relatively quiet seismically. The U.S. National Earthquake Information Center is located in Golden.

There were no casualties and only a small amount of damage was reported. It was the second-largest earthquake in Colorado's history. A magnitude 5.7 earthquake was recorded in 1973.

In the early morning hours of August 24, 2018, four minor earthquakes rattled Colorado, ranging from magnitude 2.9 to 4.3.

Colorado has recorded 525 earthquakes since 1973, a majority of which range 2 to 3.5 on the Richter scale.

Fauna

A process of extirpation by trapping and poisoning of the gray wolf (Canis lupus) from Colorado in the 1930s saw the last wild wolf in the state shot in 1945. A wolf pack recolonized Moffat County, Colorado in northwestern Colorado in 2019. Cattle farmers have expressed concern that a returning wolf population potentially threatens their herds. Coloradoans voted to reintroduce gray wolves in 2020, with the state committing to a plan to have a population in the state by 2022 and permitting non-lethal methods of driving off wolves attacking livestock and pets.

While there is fossil evidence of Harrington's mountain goat in Colorado between at least 800,000 years ago and its extinction with megafauna roughly 11,000 years ago, the mountain goat is not native to Colorado but was instead introduced to the state over time during the interval between 1947 and 1972. Despite being an artificially-introduced species, the state declared mountain goats a native species in 1993. In 2013, 2014, and 2019, an unknown illness killed nearly all mountain goat kids, leading to a Colorado Parks and Wildlife investigation.

The native population of pronghorn in Colorado has varied wildly over the last century, reaching a low of only 15,000 individuals during the 1960s. However, conservation efforts succeeded in bringing the stable population back up to roughly 66,000 by 2013. The population was estimated to have reached 85,000 by 2019 and had increasingly more run-ins with the increased suburban housing along the eastern Front Range. State wildlife officials suggested that landowners would need to modify fencing to allow the greater number of pronghorns to move unabated through the newly developed land. Pronghorns are most readily found in the northern and eastern portions of the state, with some populations also in the western San Juan Mountains.

Common wildlife found in the mountains of Colorado include mule deer, southwestern red squirrel, golden-mantled ground squirrel, yellow-bellied marmot, moose, American pika, and red fox, all at exceptionally high numbers, though moose are not native to the state. The foothills include deer, fox squirrel, desert cottontail, mountain cottontail, and coyote. The prairies are home to black-tailed prairie dog, the endangered swift fox, American badger, and white-tailed jackrabbit.

Counties 

The State of Colorado is divided into 64 counties. Two of these counties, the City and County of Broomfield and the City and County of Denver, have consolidated city and county governments. Counties are important units of government in Colorado since there are no civil townships or other minor civil divisions.

The most populous county in Colorado is El Paso County, the home of the City of Colorado Springs. The second most populous county is the City and County of Denver, the state capital. Five of the 64 counties now have more than 500,000 residents, while 12 have fewer than 5,000 residents. The ten most populous Colorado counties are all located in the Front Range Urban Corridor. Mesa County is the most populous county on the Colorado Western Slope.

Municipalities

Colorado has 272 active incorporated municipalities, comprising 197 towns, 73 cities, and two consolidated city and county governments. At the 2020 United States census, 4,299,942 of the 5,773,714 Colorado residents (74.47%) lived in one of these 272 municipalities. Another 714,417 residents (12.37%) lived in one of the 210 census-designated places, while the remaining 759,355 residents (13.15%) lived in the many rural and mountainous areas of the state.

Colorado municipalities operate under one of five types of municipal governing authority. Colorado currently has two consolidated city and county governments, 61 home rule cities, 12 statutory cities, 35 home rule towns, 161 statutory towns, and one territorial charter municipality.

The most populous municipality is the City and County of Denver. Colorado now has 13 municipalities with more than 100,000 residents, and 17 with fewer than 100 residents. The 16 most populous Colorado municipalities are all located in the Front Range Urban Corridor. The City of Grand Junction is the most populous municipality on the Colorado Western Slope. The Town of Carbonate has had no year-round population since the 1890 census due to its severe winter weather and difficult access.

Unincorporated communities

In addition to its 272 municipalities, Colorado has 210 unincorporated census-designated places (CDPs) and many other small communities. The most populous unincorporated community in Colorado is Highlands Ranch south of Denver. The seven most populous CDPs are located in the Front Range Urban Corridor. The Clifton CDP is the most populous CDP on the Colorado Western Slope.

Special districts
Colorado has more than 4,000 special districts, most with property tax authority. These districts may provide schools, law enforcement, fire protection, water, sewage, drainage, irrigation, transportation, recreation, infrastructure, cultural facilities, business support, redevelopment, or other services.

Some of these districts have the authority to levy sales tax as well as property tax and use fees. This has led to a hodgepodge of sales tax and property tax rates in Colorado. There are some street intersections in Colorado with a different sales tax rate on each corner, sometimes substantially different.

Some of the more notable Colorado districts are:
 The Regional Transportation District (RTD), which affects the counties of Denver, Boulder, Jefferson, and portions of Adams, Arapahoe, Broomfield, and Douglas Counties
 The Scientific and Cultural Facilities District (SCFD), a special regional tax district with physical boundaries contiguous with county boundaries of Adams, Arapahoe, Boulder, Broomfield, Denver, Douglas, and Jefferson Counties
 It is a 0.1% retail sales and uses tax (one penny on every $10).
 According to the Colorado statute, the SCFD distributes the money to local organizations on an annual basis. These organizations must provide for the enlightenment and entertainment of the public through the production, presentation, exhibition, advancement, or preservation of art, music, theater, dance, zoology, botany, natural history, or cultural history.
 As directed by statute, SCFD recipient organizations are currently divided into three "tiers" among which receipts are allocated by percentage.
 Tier I includes regional organizations: the Denver Art Museum, the Denver Botanic Gardens, the Denver Museum of Nature and Science, the Denver Zoo, and the Denver Center for the Performing Arts. It receives 65.5%.
 Tier II currently includes 26 regional organizations. Tier II receives 21%.
 Tier III has more than 280 local organizations such as small theaters, orchestras, art centers, natural history, cultural history, and community groups. Tier III organizations apply for funding from the county cultural councils via a grant process. This tier receives 13.5%.
 An 11-member board of directors oversees the distributions by the Colorado Revised Statutes. Seven board members are appointed by county commissioners (in Denver, the Denver City Council) and four members are appointed by the Governor of Colorado.
 The Football Stadium District (FD or FTBL), approved by the voters to pay for and help build the Denver Broncos' stadium Empower Field at Mile High.
 Local Improvement Districts (LID) within designated areas of Jefferson and Broomfield counties.
 The Metropolitan Major League Baseball Stadium District, approved by voters to pay for and help build the Colorado Rockies' stadium Coors Field.
 Regional Transportation Authority (RTA) taxes at varying rates in Basalt, Carbondale, Glenwood Springs, and Gunnison County.

Statistical areas

Most recently on March 6, 2020, the Office of Management and Budget defined 21 statistical areas for Colorado comprising four combined statistical areas, seven metropolitan statistical areas, and ten micropolitan statistical areas.

The most populous of the seven metropolitan statistical areas in Colorado is the 10-county Denver-Aurora-Lakewood, CO Metropolitan Statistical Area with a population of 2,963,821 at the 2020 United States census, an increase of +15.29% since the 2010 census.

The more extensive 12-county Denver-Aurora, CO Combined Statistical Area had a population of 3,623,560 at the 2020 census, an increase of +17.23% since the 2010 census.

The most populous extended metropolitan region in Rocky Mountain Region is the 18-county Front Range Urban Corridor along the northeast face of the Southern Rocky Mountains. This region with Denver at its center had a population of 5,055,344 at the 2020 census, an increase of +16.65% since the 2010 census.

Demographics

The 2020 United States census enumerated the population of the State of Colorado at 5,773,714, an increase of 14.80% since the 2010 United States census. The largest future increases are expected in the Front Range Urban Corridor.

People of Hispanic and Latino American (of any race made) heritage made up 20.7% of the population. According to the 2000 census, the largest ancestry groups in Colorado are German (22%) including of Swiss and Austrian nationalities, Mexican (18%), Irish (12%), and English (12%). Persons reporting German ancestry are especially numerous in the Front Range, the Rockies (west-central counties), and Eastern parts/High Plains.

Colorado has a high proportion of Hispanic, mostly Mexican-American, citizens in Metropolitan Denver, Colorado Springs, as well as the smaller cities of Greeley and Pueblo, and elsewhere. Southern, Southwestern, and Southeastern Colorado have a large number of Hispanos, the descendants of the early settlers of colonial Spanish origin. In 1940, the U.S. Census Bureau reported Colorado's population as 8.2% Hispanic and 90.3% non-Hispanic white. The Hispanic population of Colorado has continued to grow quickly over the past decades. By 2019, Hispanics made up 22% of Colorado's population, and Non-Hispanic Whites made up 70%. Spoken English in Colorado has many Spanish idioms.

Colorado also has some large African-American communities located in Denver, in the neighborhoods of Montbello, Five Points, Whittier, and many other East Denver areas. The state has sizable numbers of Asian-Americans of Mongolian, Chinese, Filipino, Korean, Southeast Asian, and Japanese descent. The highest population of Asian Americans can be found on the south and southeast side of Denver, as well as some on Denver's southwest side. The Denver metropolitan area is considered more liberal and diverse than much of the state when it comes to political issues and environmental concerns.

There were a total of 70,331 births in Colorado in 2006. (Birth rate of 14.6 per thousand.) In 2007, non-Hispanic whites were involved in 59.1% of all births. Some 14.06% of those births involved a non-Hispanic white person and someone of a different race, most often with a couple including one Hispanic. A birth where at least one Hispanic person was involved counted for 43% of the births in Colorado. As of the 2010 census, Colorado has the seventh highest percentage of Hispanics (20.7%) in the U.S. behind New Mexico (46.3%), California (37.6%), Texas (37.6%), Arizona (29.6%), Nevada (26.5%), and Florida (22.5%). Per the 2000 census, the Hispanic population is estimated to be 918,899, or approximately 20% of the state's total population. Colorado has the 5th-largest population of Mexican-Americans, behind California, Texas, Arizona, and Illinois. In percentages, Colorado has the 6th-highest percentage of Mexican-Americans, behind New Mexico, California, Texas, Arizona, and Nevada.

Birth data
In 2011, 46% of Colorado's population younger than the age of one were minorities, meaning that they had at least one parent who was not non-Hispanic white.

Note: Births in table don't add up, because Hispanics are counted both by their ethnicity and by their race, giving a higher overall number.

 Since 2016, data for births of White Hispanic origin are not collected, but included in one Hispanic group; persons of Hispanic origin may be of any race.

In 2017, Colorado recorded the second-lowest fertility rate in the United States outside of New England, after Oregon, at 1.63 children per woman. Significant, contributing factors to the decline in pregnancies were the  Title X Family Planning Program and an intrauterine device grant from Warren Buffett's family.

Language
English, the official language of the state, is the most commonly spoken in Colorado, followed by Spanish. One Native American language still spoken in Colorado is the Colorado River Numic language also known as the Ute dialect.

Religion

Major religious affiliations of the people of Colorado as of 2014 were 64% Christian, of whom there are 44% Protestant, 16% Roman Catholic, 3% Mormon, and 1% Eastern Orthodox. Other religious breakdowns according to the Pew Research Center were 1% Jewish, 1% Muslim, 1% Buddhist and 4% other. The religiously unaffiliated made up 29% of the population. In 2020, according to the Public Religion Research Institute, Christianity was 66% of the population. Judaism was also reported to have increased in this separate study, forming 2% of the religious landscape, while the religiously unaffiliated were reported to form 28% of the population in this separate study.

The largest denominations by the number of adherents in 2010 were the Catholic Church with 811,630; multi-denominational Evangelical Protestants with 229,981; and the Church of Jesus Christ of Latter-day Saints with 151,433.

Our Lady of Guadalupe Catholic Church was the first permanent Catholic parish in modern-day Colorado and was constructed by Spanish colonists from New Mexico in modern-day Conejos. Latin Church Catholics are served by three dioceses: the Archdiocese of Denver and the Dioceses of Colorado Springs and Pueblo.

The first permanent settlement by members of the Church of Jesus Christ of Latter-day Saints in Colorado arrived from Mississippi and initially camped along the Arkansas River just east of the present-day site of Pueblo.

Health
Colorado is generally considered among the healthiest states by behavioral and healthcare researchers. Among the positive contributing factors is the state's well-known outdoor recreation opportunities and initiatives. However, there is a stratification of health metrics with wealthier counties such as Douglas and Pitkin performing significantly better relative to southern, less wealthy counties such as Huerfano and Las Animas.

Obesity
According to several studies, Coloradans have the lowest rates of obesity of any state in the US. , 24% of the population was considered medically obese, and while the lowest in the nation, the percentage had increased from 17% in 2004.

Life expectancy
According to a report in the Journal of the American Medical Association, residents of Colorado had a 2014 life expectancy of 80.21 years, the longest of any U.S. state.

Homelessness 
According to HUD's 2022 Annual Homeless Assessment Report, there were an estimated 10,397 homeless people in Colorado.

Economy

 Total employment (2019): 2,473,192
 Number of employer establishments: 174,258

The total state product in 2015 was $318.6 billion. Median Annual Household Income in 2016 was $70,666, 8th in the nation. Per capita personal income in 2010 was $51,940, ranking Colorado 11th in the nation. The state's economy broadened from its mid-19th-century roots in mining when irrigated agriculture developed, and by the late 19th century, raising livestock had become important. Early industry was based on the extraction and processing of minerals and agricultural products. Current agricultural products are cattle, wheat, dairy products, corn, and hay.

The federal government operates several federal facilities in the state, including NORAD (North American Aerospace Defense Command), United States Air Force Academy, Schriever Air Force Base located approximately 10 miles (16 kilometers) east of Peterson Air Force Base, and Fort Carson, both located in Colorado Springs within El Paso County; NOAA, the National Renewable Energy Laboratory (NREL) in Golden, and the National Institute of Standards and Technology in Boulder; U.S. Geological Survey and other government agencies at the Denver Federal Center near Lakewood; the Denver Mint, Buckley Space Force Base, the Tenth Circuit Court of Appeals, and the Byron G. Rogers Federal Building and United States Courthouse in Denver; and a federal Supermax Prison and other federal prisons near Cañon City.
In the second half of the 20th century, the industrial and service sectors expanded greatly. The state's economy is diversified and is notable for its concentration on scientific research and high-technology industries. Other industries include food processing, transportation equipment, machinery, chemical products, the extraction of metals such as gold (see Gold mining in Colorado), silver, and molybdenum. Colorado now also has the largest annual production of beer in any state. Denver is an important financial center.

The state's diverse geography and majestic mountains attract millions of tourists every year, including 85.2 million in 2018. Tourism contributes greatly to Colorado's economy, with tourists generating $22.3 billion in 2018.

Several nationally known brand names have originated in Colorado factories and laboratories. From Denver came the forerunner of telecommunications giant Qwest in 1879, Samsonite luggage in 1910, Gates belts and hoses in 1911, and Russell Stover Candies in 1923. Kuner canned vegetables began in Brighton in 1864. From Golden came Coors beer in 1873, CoorsTek industrial ceramics in 1920, and Jolly Rancher candy in 1949. CF&I railroad rails, wire, nails, and pipe debuted in Pueblo in 1892. Holly Sugar was first milled from beets in Holly in 1905, and later moved its headquarters to Colorado Springs. The present-day Swift packed meat of Greeley evolved from Monfort of Colorado, Inc., established in 1930. Estes model rockets were launched in Penrose in 1958. Fort Collins has been the home of Woodward Governor Company's motor controllers (governors) since 1870, and Waterpik dental water jets and showerheads since 1962. Celestial Seasonings herbal teas have been made in Boulder since 1969. Rocky Mountain Chocolate Factory made its first candy in Durango in 1981.

Colorado has a flat 4.63% income tax, regardless of income level. On November 3, 2020, voters authorized an initiative to lower that income tax rate to 4.55 percent. Unlike most states, which calculate taxes based on federal adjusted gross income, Colorado taxes are based on taxable income—income after federal exemptions and federal itemized (or standard) deductions. Colorado's state sales tax is 2.9% on retail sales. When state revenues exceed state constitutional limits, according to Colorado's Taxpayer Bill of Rights legislation, full-year Colorado residents can claim a sales tax refund on their individual state income tax return. Many counties and cities charge their own rates, in addition to the base state rate. There are also certain county and special district taxes that may apply.

Real estate and personal business property are taxable in Colorado. The state's senior property tax exemption was temporarily suspended by the Colorado Legislature in 2003. The tax break was scheduled to return for the assessment year 2006, payable in 2007.

, the state's unemployment rate was 4.2%.

The West Virginia teachers' strike in 2018 inspired teachers in other states, including Colorado, to take similar action.

Agriculture
Corn in grown in the Eastern Plains of Colorado. Arid conditions and drought negatively impacted yields in 2020 and 2022.

Natural resources

Colorado has significant hydrocarbon resources. According to the Energy Information Administration, Colorado hosts seven of the largest natural gas fields in the United States, and two of the largest oil fields. Conventional and unconventional natural gas output from several Colorado basins typically accounts for more than five percent of annual U.S. natural gas production. Colorado's oil shale deposits hold an estimated  of oil—nearly as much oil as the entire world's proven oil reserves. Substantial deposits of bituminous, subbituminous, and lignite coal are found in the state.

Uranium mining in Colorado goes back to 1872, when pitchblende ore was taken from gold mines near Central City, Colorado. Not counting byproduct uranium from phosphate, Colorado is considered to have the third-largest uranium reserves of any U.S. state, behind Wyoming and New Mexico. When Colorado and Utah dominated radium mining from 1910 to 1922, uranium and vanadium were the byproducts (giving towns like present-day Superfund site Uravan their names). Uranium price increases from 2001 to 2007 prompted several companies to revive uranium mining in Colorado. During the 1940s, certain communities–including Naturita and Paradox–earned the moniker of "yellowcake towns" from their relationship with uranium mining. Price drops and financing problems in late 2008 forced these companies to cancel or scale back the uranium-mining project. As of 2016, there were no major uranium mining operations in the state, though plans existed to restart production.

Electricity generation

Colorado's high Rocky Mountain ridges and eastern plains offer wind power potential, and geologic activity in the mountain areas provides the potential for geothermal power development. Much of the state is sunny and could produce solar power. Major rivers flowing from the Rocky Mountains offer hydroelectric power resources.

Culture

Arts and film

 List of museums in Colorado
 List of theaters in Colorado
 Music of Colorado

Several film productions have been shot on location in Colorado, especially prominent Westerns like True Grit, The Searchers, and Butch Cassidy and the Sundance Kid. Several historic military forts, railways with trains still operating, and mining ghost towns have been used and transformed for historical accuracy in well-known films. There are also several scenic highways and mountain passes that helped to feature the open road in films such as Vanishing Point, Bingo and Starman. Some Colorado landmarks have been featured in films, such as The Stanley Hotel in Dumb and Dumber and The Shining and the Sculptured House in Sleeper. In 2015, Furious 7 was to film driving sequences on Pikes Peak Highway in Colorado. The TV series Good Luck Charlie was set, but not filmed, in Denver, Colorado. The Colorado Office of Film and Television has noted that more than 400 films have been shot in Colorado.

There are also several established film festivals in Colorado, including Aspen Shortsfest, Boulder International Film Festival, Castle Rock Film Festival, Denver Film Festival, Festivus Film Festival, Mile High Horror Film Festival, Moondance International Film Festival, Mountainfilm in Telluride, Rocky Mountain Women's Film Festival, and Telluride Film Festival.

Many notable writers have lived or spent extended periods in Colorado. Beat Generation writers Jack Kerouac and Neal Cassady lived in and around Denver for several years each. Irish playwright Oscar Wilde visited Colorado on his tour of the United States in 1882, writing in his 1906 Impressions of America that Leadville was "the richest city in the world.  It has also got the reputation of being the roughest, and every man carries a revolver."

Cuisine

Colorado is known for its Southwest and Rocky Mountain cuisine, with Mexican restaurants found throughout the state.

Boulder was named America's Foodiest Town 2010 by Bon Appétit. Boulder, and Colorado in general, is home to several national food and beverage companies, top-tier restaurants and farmers' markets. Boulder also has more Master Sommeliers per capita than any other city, including San Francisco and New York. Denver is known for steak, but now has a diverse culinary scene with many restaurants.

Polidori Sausage is a brand of pork products available in supermarkets, which originated in Colorado, in the early 20th century.

The Food & Wine Classic is held annually each June in Aspen. Aspen also has a reputation as the culinary capital of the Rocky Mountain region.

Wine and beer

Colorado wines include award-winning varietals that have attracted favorable notice from outside the state. With wines made from traditional Vitis vinifera grapes along with wines made from cherries, peaches, plums, and honey, Colorado wines have won top national and international awards for their quality. The mountain climate ensures warm summer days and cool nights. Colorado is home to two designated American Viticultural Areas of the Grand Valley AVA and the West Elks AVA, where most of the vineyards in the state are located. However, an increasing number of wineries are located along the Front Range. In 2018, Wine Enthusiast Magazine named Colorado's Grand Valley AVA in Mesa County, Colorado, as one of the Top Ten wine travel destinations in the world.

Colorado is home to many nationally praised microbreweries, including New Belgium Brewing Company, Odell Brewing Company, Great Divide Brewing Company, and Bristol Brewing Company. The area of northern Colorado near and between the cities of Denver, Boulder, and Fort Collins is known as the "Napa Valley of Beer" due to its high density of craft breweries.

Marijuana and hemp

Colorado is open to cannabis (marijuana) tourism. With the adoption of the 64th state amendment in 2012, Colorado became the first state in the union to legalize marijuana for medicinal (2000), industrial (referring to hemp, 2012), and recreational (2012) use. Colorado's marijuana industry sold $1.31 billion worth of marijuana in 2016 and $1.26 billion in the first three-quarters of 2017. The state generated tax, fee, and license revenue of $194 million in 2016 on legal marijuana sales. Colorado regulates hemp as any part of the plant with less than 0.3% THC.

On April 4, 2014, Senate Bill 14–184 addressing oversight of Colorado's industrial hemp program was first introduced, ultimately being signed into law by Governor John Hickenlooper on May 31, 2014.

Medicinal use

On November 7, 2000, 54% of Colorado voters passed Amendment 20, which amends the Colorado State constitution to allow the medical use of marijuana. A patient's medical use of marijuana, within the following limits, is lawful:
 (II) No more than twelve marijuana plants, with six or fewer being mature, flowering plants that are producing a usable form of marijuana.
Currently, Colorado has listed "eight medical conditions for which patients can use marijuana—cancer, glaucoma, HIV/AIDS, muscle spasms, seizures, severe pain, severe nausea and cachexia, or dramatic weight loss and muscle atrophy". While governor, John Hickenlooper allocated about half of the state's $13 million "Medical Marijuana Program Cash Fund" to medical research in the 2014 budget. By 2018, the Medical Marijuana Program Cash Fund was the "largest pool of pot money in the state" and was used to fund programs including research into pediatric applications for controlling autism symptoms.

Recreational use

On November 6, 2012, voters amended the state constitution to protect "personal use" of marijuana for adults, establishing a framework to regulate marijuana in a manner similar to alcohol. The first recreational marijuana shops in Colorado, and by extension the United States, opened their doors on January 1, 2014.

Sports

Colorado has five major professional sports leagues, all based in the Denver metropolitan area. Colorado is the least populous state with a franchise in each of the major professional sports leagues.

The Colorado Springs Snow Sox professional baseball team is based in Colorado Springs. The team is a member of the Pecos League, an independent baseball league which is not affiliated with Major or Minor League Baseball.

The Pikes Peak International Hill Climb is a major hill climbing motor race held on the Pikes Peak Highway.

The Cherry Hills Country Club has hosted several professional golf tournaments, including the U.S. Open, U.S. Senior Open, U.S. Women's Open, PGA Championship and BMW Championship.

Professional sports teams

College athletics

The following universities and colleges participate in the National Collegiate Athletic Association Division I. The most popular college sports program is the University of Colorado Buffaloes, who used to play in the Big-12 but now play in the Pac-12. They have won the 1957 and 1991 Orange Bowl, 1995 Fiesta Bowl, and 1996 Cotton Bowl Classic.

Transportation

Colorado's primary mode of transportation (in terms of passengers) is its highway system. Interstate 25 (I-25) is the primary north–south highway in the state, connecting Pueblo, Colorado Springs, Denver, and Fort Collins, and extending north to Wyoming and south to New Mexico. I-70 is the primary east–west corridor. It connects Grand Junction and the mountain communities with Denver and enters Utah and Kansas. The state is home to a network of US and Colorado highways that provide access to all principal areas of the state. Many smaller communities are connected to this network only via county roads.

Denver International Airport (DIA) is the third-busiest domestic U.S. and international airport in the world by passenger traffic. DIA handles by far the largest volume of commercial air traffic in Colorado and is the busiest U.S. hub airport between Chicago and the Pacific coast, making Denver the most important airport for connecting passenger traffic in the western United States.

Public transportation bus services are offered both intra-city and inter-city—including the Denver metro area's RTD services. The Regional Transportation District (RTD) operates the popular RTD Bus & Rail transit system in the Denver Metropolitan Area.  the RTD rail system had 170 light-rail vehicles, serving  of track. In addition to local public transit, intercity bus service is provided by Burlington Trailways, Bustang, Express Arrow, and Greyhound Lines.

Amtrak operates two passenger rail lines in Colorado, the California Zephyr and Southwest Chief. Colorado's contribution to world railroad history was forged principally by the Denver and Rio Grande Western Railroad which began in 1870 and wrote the book on mountain railroading. In 1988 the "Rio Grande" was acquired, but was merged into, the Southern Pacific Railroad by their joint owner Philip Anschutz. On September 11, 1996, Anschutz sold the combined company to the Union Pacific Railroad, creating the largest railroad network in the United States. The Anschutz sale was partly in response to the earlier merger of Burlington Northern and Santa Fe which formed the large Burlington Northern and Santa Fe Railway (BNSF), Union Pacific's principal competitor in western U.S. railroading. Both Union Pacific and BNSF have extensive freight operations in Colorado.

Colorado's freight railroad network consists of 2,688 miles of Class I trackage. It is integral to the U.S. economy, being a critical artery for the movement of energy, agriculture, mining, and industrial commodities as well as general freight and manufactured products between the East and Midwest and the Pacific coast states.

In August 2014, Colorado began to issue driver licenses to aliens not lawfully in the United States who lived in Colorado. In September 2014, KCNC reported that 524 non-citizens were issued Colorado driver licenses that are normally issued to U.S. citizens living in Colorado.

Education

The first institution of higher education in the Colorado Territory was the Colorado Seminary, opened on November 16, 1864, by the Methodist Episcopal Church. The seminary closed in 1867 but reopened in 1880 as the University of Denver. In 1870, the Bishop George Maxwell Randall of the Episcopal Missionary District of Colorado and Parts Adjacent opened the first of what become the Colorado University Schools which would include the Territorial School of Mines opened in 1873 and sold to the Colorado Territory in 1874. These schools were initially run by the Episcopal Church. An 1861 territorial act called for the creation of a public university in Boulder, though it would not be until 1876 that the University of Colorado was founded. The 1876 act also renamed Territorial School of Mines as the Colorado School of Mines. An 1870 territorial act created the Agricultural College of Colorado which opened in 1879. The college was renamed the Colorado State College of Agriculture and Mechanic Arts in 1935, and became Colorado State University in 1957.

The first Catholic college in Colorado was the Jesuit Sacred Heart College, which was founded in New Mexico in 1877, moved to Morrison in 1884, and to Denver in 1887. The college was renamed Regis College in 1921 and Regis University in 1991. On April 1, 1924, armed students patrolled the campus after a burning cross was found, the climax of tensions between Regis College and the locally-powerful Ku Klux Klan.

Following a 1950 assessment by the Service Academy Board, it was determined that there was a need to supplement the U.S. Military and Naval Academies with a third school that would provide commissioned officers for the newly independent Air Force. On April 1, 1954, President Dwight Eisenhower signed a law that moved for the creation of a U.S. Air Force Academy. Later that year, Colorado Springs was selected to host the new institution. From its establishment in 1955, until the construction of appropriate facilities in Colorado Springs was completed and opened in 1958, the Air Force Academy operated out of Lowry Air Force Base in Denver. With the opening of the Colorado Springs facility, the cadets moved to the new campus, though not in the full-kit march that some urban and campus legends suggest. The first class of Space Force officers from the Air Force Academy commissioned on April 18, 2020.

 Adams State University
 Aims Community College
 Arapahoe Community College
 Belleview Christian College & Bible Seminary
 Colorado Christian University
 Colorado College
 Colorado Mesa University
 Colorado Mountain College
 Colorado Northwestern Community College
 Colorado School of Mines
 Colorado State University System
 Colorado State University
 Colorado State University Pueblo
 CSU–Global Campus
 Colorado Technical University
 Community College of Aurora
 Community College of Denver
 Denver Seminary
 DeVry University
 Emily Griffith Opportunity School
 Fort Lewis College
 Front Range Community College
 Iliff School of Theology
Johnson & Wales University
 Lamar Community College
 Metropolitan State University of Denver
 Morgan Community College
 Naropa University
 Nazarene Bible College
 Northeastern Junior College
 Otero College
 Pikes Peak State College
 Pueblo Community College
 Red Rocks Community College
 Regis University
 Rocky Mountain College of Art and Design
 Rocky Vista University College of Osteopathic Medicine
 Trinidad State College
 United States Air Force Academy
 University of Colorado System
 University of Colorado Boulder
 University of Colorado Colorado Springs
 University of Colorado Denver
 Anschutz Medical Campus
 Auraria Campus
 University of Denver
 University of Northern Colorado
 Western Colorado University

Military installations

The major military installations in Colorado include:
 Buckley Space Force Base (1938–)
 Air Reserve Personnel Center (1953–)
 Fort Carson (U.S. Army 1942–) 
 Piñon Canyon Maneuver Site (1983–)
 Peterson Space Force Base (1942–)
 Cheyenne Mountain Space Force Station (1961–)
 Pueblo Chemical Depot (U.S. Army 1942–)
 Schriever Space Force Base (1983–)
 United States Air Force Academy (1954–)
Former military posts in Colorado include:
 Spanish Fort (Spanish Army 1819–1821)
 Fort Massachusetts (U.S. Army 1852–1858)
 Fort Garland (U.S. Army 1858–1883)
 Camp Collins (U.S. Army 1862–1870)
 Fort Logan (U.S. Army 1887–1946)
 Colorado National Guard Armory (1913-1933)
 Fitzsimons Army Hospital (U.S. Army 1918–1999)
 Denver Medical Depot (U.S. Army 1925–1949)
 Lowry Air Force Base (1938–1994)
 Pueblo Army Air Base (1941-1948)
 Rocky Mountain Arsenal (U.S. Army 1942–1992)
 Camp Hale (U.S. Army 1942–1945)
 La Junta Army Air Field (1942-1946)
 Leadville Army Air Field (1943-1944)

Government

State government

Like the federal government and all other U.S. states, Colorado's state constitution provides for three branches of government: the legislative, the executive, and the judicial branches.

The Governor of Colorado heads the state's executive branch. The current governor is Jared Polis, a Democrat. Colorado's other statewide elected executive officers are the Lieutenant Governor of Colorado (elected on a ticket with the Governor), Secretary of State of Colorado, Colorado State Treasurer, and Attorney General of Colorado, all of whom serve four-year terms.

The seven-member Colorado Supreme Court is the state's highest court, with seven justices. The Colorado Court of Appeals, with 22 judges, sits in divisions of three judges each. Colorado is divided into 22 judicial districts, each of which has a district court and a county court with limited jurisdiction. The state also has specialized water courts, which sit in seven distinct divisions around the state and which decide matters relating to water rights and the use and administration of water.

The state legislative body is the Colorado General Assembly, which is made up of two houses – the House of Representatives and the Senate. The House has 65 members and the Senate has 35. , the Democratic Party holds a 20 to 15 majority in the Senate and a 41 to 24 majority in the House.

Most Coloradans are native to other states (nearly 60% according to the 2000 census), and this is illustrated by the fact that the state did not have a native-born governor from 1975 (when John David Vanderhoof left office) until 2007, when Bill Ritter took office; his election the previous year marked the first electoral victory for a native-born Coloradan in a gubernatorial race since 1958 (Vanderhoof had ascended from the Lieutenant Governorship when John Arthur Love was given a position in Richard Nixon's administration in 1973).

Tax is collected by the Colorado Department of Revenue.

Politics

Colorado was once considered a swing state, but has become a relatively safe blue state in both state and federal elections. In presidential elections, it had not been won until 2020 by double digits since 1984 and has backed the winning candidate in 9 of the last 11 elections. Coloradans have elected 17 Democrats and 12 Republicans to the governorship in the last 100 years.

In presidential politics, Colorado was considered a reliably Republican state during the post-World War II era, voting for the Democratic candidate only in 1948, 1964, and 1992. However, it became a competitive swing state in the 1990s. Since the mid-2000s, it has swung heavily to the Democrats, voting for Barack Obama in 2008 and 2012, Hillary Clinton in 2016, and Joe Biden in 2020.

Colorado politics has the contrast between conservative cities such as Colorado Springs and Grand Junction and liberal cities such as Boulder and Denver. Democrats are strongest in metropolitan Denver, the college towns of Fort Collins and Boulder, southern Colorado (including Pueblo), and several western ski resort counties. The Republicans are strongest in the Eastern Plains, Colorado Springs, Greeley, and far Western Colorado near Grand Junction.

Colorado is represented by two United States Senators:
 United States Senate Class 2, John Hickenlooper (Democratic) 2021–
 United States Senate Class 3, Michael Bennet (Democratic) 2009–
Colorado is represented by seven Representatives to the United States House of Representatives:
 Colorado's 1st congressional district, Diana DeGette (Democratic) 1997–
 Colorado's 2nd congressional district, Joe Neguse (Democratic) 2019–
 Colorado's 3rd congressional district, Lauren Boebert (Republican) 2021–
 Colorado's 4th congressional district, Ken Buck (Republican) 2015–
 Colorado's 5th congressional district, Doug Lamborn (Republican) 2007–
 Colorado's 6th congressional district, Jason Crow (Democratic) 2019–
 Colorado's 7th congressional district, Brittany Pettersen (Democratic) 2023–
 Colorado's 8th congressional district, Yadira Caraveo (Democratic) 2023–

In a 2020 study, Colorado was ranked as the 7th easiest state for citizens to vote in.

Significant initiatives and legislation enacted in Colorado

In 1881 Colorado voters approved a referendum that selected Denver as the state capital.

Colorado was the first state in the union to enact, by voter referendum, a law extending suffrage to women. That initiative was approved by the state's voters on November 7, 1893.

On the November 8, 1932, ballot, Colorado approved the repeal of alcohol prohibition more than a year before the Twenty-first Amendment to the United States Constitution was ratified.

Colorado has banned, via C.R.S. section 12-6-302, the sale of motor vehicles on Sunday since at least 1953.

In 1972 Colorado voters rejected a referendum proposal to fund the 1976 Winter Olympics, which had been scheduled to be held in the state. Denver had been chosen by the International Olympic Committee as the host city on May 12, 1970.

In 1992, by a margin of 53 to 47 percent, Colorado voters approved an amendment to the state constitution (Amendment 2) that would have prevented any city, town, or county in the state from taking any legislative, executive or judicial action to recognize homosexuals or bisexuals as a protected class. In 1996, in a 6–3 ruling in Romer v. Evans, the U.S. Supreme Court found that preventing protected status based upon homosexuality or bisexuality did not satisfy the Equal Protection Clause.

In 2006, voters passed Amendment 43, which banned gay marriage in Colorado. That initiative was nullified by the U.S. Supreme Court's 2015 decision in Obergefell v. Hodges.

In 2012, voters amended the state constitution protecting the "personal use" of marijuana for adults, establishing a framework to regulate cannabis like alcohol. The first recreational marijuana shops in Colorado, and by extension the United States, opened their doors on January 1, 2014.

On May 29, 2019, Governor Jared Polis signed House Bill 1124 immediately prohibiting law enforcement officials in Colorado from holding undocumented immigrants solely based on a request from U.S. Immigration and Customs Enforcement.

Native American reservations

The two Native American reservations remaining in Colorado are:
Southern Ute Indian Reservation — Southern Ute Indian Tribe (1873; Ute dialect: Kapuuta-wa Moghwachi Núuchi-u)
Ute Mountain Ute Indian Reservation — Ute Mountain Ute Tribe (1940; Ute dialect: Wʉgama Núuchi)
The two abolished Indian reservations in Colorado were:
Cheyenne and Arapaho Indian Reservation (1851–1870)
Ute Indian Reservation (1855–1873)

Protected areas

Colorado is home to 4 national parks, 9 national monuments, 3 national historic sites, 2 national recreation areas, 4 national historic trails, 1 national scenic trail, 11 national forests, 2 national grasslands, 44 national wildernesses, 3 national conservation areas, 8 national wildlife refuges, 3 national heritage areas, 26 national historic landmarks, 16 national natural landmarks, more than 1,500 National Register of Historic Places, 1 wild and scenic river, 42 state parks, 307 state wildlife areas, 93 state natural areas, 28 national recreation trails, 6 regional trails, and numerous other scenic, historic, and recreational areas.

The following are the 23 units of the National Park System in Colorado:
Amache National Historic Site (2022)
Arapaho National Recreation Area (1978)
Bent's Old Fort National Historic Site (1960)
Black Canyon of the Gunnison National Park (NM 1933, NP 1999)
Browns Canyon National Monument (2015)
California National Historic Trail (1992)
Camp Hale-Continental Divide National Monument (2022)
Canyons of the Ancients National Monument (2000)
Chimney Rock National Monument (2012)
Colorado National Monument (1911)
Continental Divide National Scenic Trail (1978)
Curecanti National Recreation Area (1965)
Dinosaur National Monument (1915)
Florissant Fossil Beds National Monument (1969)
Great Sand Dunes National Park and Preserve (NM 1932, NP 2004)
Hovenweep National Monument (1923)
Mesa Verde National Park (1906) and UNESCO World Heritage Site (1978)
Old Spanish National Historic Trail (2002)
Pony Express National Historic Trail (1992)
Rocky Mountain National Park (1915)
Sand Creek Massacre National Historic Site (2007)
Santa Fe National Historic Trail (1987)
Yucca House National Monument (1919)

See also

Outline of Colorado
Index of Colorado-related articles
Bibliography of Colorado
USS Colorado, 4 ships

Footnotes

References

Further reading

 Explore Colorado, A Naturalist's Handbook, The Denver Museum of Natural History and Westcliff Publishers, 1995,  for an excellent guide to the ecological regions of Colorado.
 The Archeology of Colorado, Revised Edition, E. Steve Cassells, Johnson Books, Boulder, Colorado, 1997, trade paperback, .
 Chokecherry Places, Essays from the High Plains, Merrill Gilfillan, Johnson Press, Boulder, Colorado, trade paperback, .
 
 The Tie That Binds, Kent Haruf, 1984, hardcover, a fictional account of farming in Colorado.
 Railroads of Colorado: Your Guide to Colorado's Historic Trains and Railway Sites, Claude Wiatrowski, Voyageur Press, 2002, hardcover, 160 pages,

External links

State government
 Colorado state government website
 Colorado tourism website
 History Colorado website

Federal government
 Energy & Environmental Data for Colorado
 USGS Colorado state facts, real-time, geographic, and other scientific resources of Colorado
 United States Census Bureau
 Colorado QuickFacts
 2000 Census of Population and Housing for Colorado
 USDA ERS Colorado state facts

Other
 List of searchable databases produced by Colorado state agencies hosted by the American Library Association Government Documents Roundtable
 Colorado County Evolution
 Ask Colorado
 Colorado Historic Newspapers Collection (CHNC)
 Mountain and Desert Plants of Colorado and the Southwest,
 Climate of Colorado 
 
 
 Holocene Volcano in Colorado (Smithsonian Institution Global Volcanism Program) 

 
Former Spanish colonies
States and territories established in 1876
States of the United States
Western United States
 
Contiguous United States